Varėnė is a river of  Alytus district municipality and Varėna district municipality, Alytus County, southern Lithuania. It flows for 48 kilometres and has a basin area of 411 km².

The Varėnė begins near Skaičionys village. There are a lot of water springs at its upper course. Varėnė crosses the Varėnis Lake near its mouth. It joins the Merkys near Varėna city.

Varėnė suits well for water tourism.

References
 LIETUVOS RESPUBLIKOS UPIŲ IR TVENKINIŲ KLASIFIKATORIUS (Republic of Lithuania- River and Pond Classifications).  Ministry of Environment (Lithuania). Accessed 2011-11-11.

Rivers of Lithuania
Alytus District Municipality